Robert Ridgway, sometimes spelled Robert Ridgeway (October 19, 1862 – December 19, 1938), was an American civil engineer.  He did not study engineering at any school, but worked 49 years for New York City in the construction of major projects, and became Chief Engineer of the Transit Commission in 1921.  He became president of the American Society of Civil Engineers (ASCE) Metropolitan section.  Further he became president of the national ASCE in 1925.  The Ridgway Awards are an annual award of the ASCE Met section named for him.

At the time of his death, Ridgway was consulting Secretary of the Interior Harold L. Ickes on Chicago's first subway.  According to the December 20, 1938 edition of the Brooklyn Eagle, he died in Fort Wayne, Indiana after suffering a heart attack, while en route to New York after attending ground-breaking ceremonies for the Chicago Subway.  He was 76.

Works
Major projects he worked on include the New Croton Aqueduct; the first NYC subway line; the first East River subway tunnel; the Catskill Aqueduct, the expansion of the IRT and BMT subways; and the construction of the IND subway.

In 1914, he was serving as Engineer of Subway Construction.  A number of his works are listed on the National Register of Historic Places, with several listed in relation to one multiple property study, the "New York City Subway System MPS".

Works he is credited with include the following subway infrastructure projects:
15th Street–Prospect Park subway station, 15th Street and Prospect Park West, Brooklyn, NRHP-listed
181st Street subway station, Fort Washington Avenue, Between West 185th and 181st Streets. Manhattan, NRHP-listed
190th Street subway station, Fort Washington Avenue between Fort Tryon Park (Cabrini Boulevard) and West 190th Street, Manhattan, NRHP-listed
207th Street Yard – Signal Service Building and Tower B, West 215th Street between Tenth Avenue and the Harlem River, Manhattan, NRHP-listed
Concourse Yard Entry Buildings, West 205th Street, between Jerome and Paul Avenues, The Bronx, NRHP-listed
Concourse Yard Substation, 3119 Jerome Avenue, The Bronx, NRHP-listed
Coney Island Yard Gatehouse, SW corner of Shell Road and Avenue X, Brooklyn, NRHP-listed
Flushing – Main Street subway station, Near junction of Roosevelt Avenue and Main Street, Queens, NRHP-listed
West Fourth Street–Washington Square subway station, Under Sixth Avenue between West Third Street and Waverly Place, Manhattan, NRHP-listed
Wilson Avenue subway station, Chauncey Street at Wilson Avenue, Brooklyn, NRHP-listed

References

1862 births
1938 deaths
American civil engineers
Engineers from New York City